Kenwood may refer to:

Places 
 England
 Kenwood (or Ken Wood), a part of Hampstead Heath, London, the location of
 Kenwood House
 Kenwood, in the parish of Kenton, Devon
 Kenwood, St. George's Hill, John Lennon's home in Weybridge, Surrey

 United States
 Kenwood, California
 Kenwood, Missouri
 Kenwood, Ohio
 Kenwood, Oklahoma
 Neighborhoods and districts:
 Kenwood Historic District (St. Petersburg, Florida), Florida Registered Historic District
 Kenwood, Chicago, Illinois
 Kenwood District, Chicago Landmark District
 North Kenwood District, Chicago Landmark District
 Kenwood (Duluth), Minnesota
 Kenwood, Minneapolis, Minnesota
 Kenwood, Albany, New York
 Kenwood Historic District (Enid, Oklahoma)
 Kenwood, Roanoke, Virginia
 Kenwood (Gloucester, Virginia), a historic house and property
 Kenwood (Huntington, West Virginia), a historic house

Businesses 
 Kenwood Corporation, Japanese maker of radio and electronic equipment, owned by the Japanese company JVC-Kenwood
 Kenwood Limited, British maker of small kitchen appliances owned by the Italian company De'Longhi
 Kenwood Towne Centre, a shopping mall

Schools 
 Kenwood Academy, a junior-senior high school opened as Kenwood High School in 1969 in Chicago, Cook County, Illinois
 Kenwood High School (Maryland), established in 1931 in Essex, Baltimore County, Maryland
 Kenwood High School (Tennessee), established in 1997 in Clarksville, Montgomery County, Tennessee

People 
 Ken Wood (disambiguation)